Michael Pellegrino (born January 18, 2001) is an American soccer player who currently plays college soccer at the University of Notre Dame.

Youth
Pellegrino played with the Philadelphia Union academy from 2015 to 2019. While with the academy, Pellegrino also appeared for the club's USL Championship side Bethlehem Steel during their 2019 season.

College
In April 2018, Pellegrino committed to playing college soccer at the University of Notre Dame from 2019 onward.

References

External links 
 

2001 births
Living people
American soccer players
Association football midfielders
Philadelphia Union II players
Notre Dame Fighting Irish men's soccer players
People from Wenonah, New Jersey
Soccer players from New Jersey
Sportspeople from Gloucester County, New Jersey
USL Championship players